Itsurō, Itsuro, Itsurou or Itsuroh (written: 逸郎 or 逸朗) is a masculine Japanese given name. Notable people with the name include:

, Japanese anime director
, Japanese Marxian economist
, Japanese lawyer

Japanese masculine given names